Hon'inbō San'etsu (本因坊算悦, 1611–1658) was a professional Go player, and second head of the Hon'inbō house.

Biography 
San'etsu was the second Hon'inbō. A minor at the time of Hon'inbō Sansa's death, he inherited a difficult situation since he could not receive the official allowance for the house. Sansa had asked Nakamura Dōseki to act as San'etsu's guardian, and through Dōseki's good offices an annual 30 koku of rice was negotiated. During his minority the position of head of the Hon'inbō house was in abeyance, so that the house notionally did not exist.

He played in an international match, giving Peichin Tsuhanoko of the Ryukyu Kingdom a two-stone handicap, when the latter came to Japan with a Ryukyuan embassy in 1634.

The high point of San'etsu's professional career came in a challenge match against Yasui Sanchi. From 1645 to 1653 they played six games of oshirogo, but the result was 3-3. Neither player therefore made the step up from 8 dan to Meijin.

Notes

External links
At Gobase

1611 births
1658 deaths
Japanese Go players
17th-century Go players